Attidops is a genus of jumping spiders (family Salticidae). It is closely related to the genera Ballus, Admestina and Icius.

Description
Attidops are from two to three millimeters in body length, with a dark reddish-brown prosoma which is darker around the eyes. On the underside, and on the legs they are reddish- to yellowish-brown. The entire body, but especially the sides are sparsely covered with short white hairs and translucent clear to white flattened hairs that look like scales. The sexes look similar to each other.

Distribution
Spiders of this genus occur in North America from Canada to Mexico.

Name
The genus name is combined from -attus, a common ending for salticid genera, and Greek '-ops' "to look like". Banks (1905) created the genus in a footnote, stating simply "Attidops, a new genus for Ballus youngi Peck".

Species
, the World Spider Catalog accepted the following species:
 Attidops cinctipes (Banks, 1900) – United States
 Attidops cutleri Edwards, 1999 – USA, Mexico
 Attidops nickersoni Edwards, 1999 – USA
 Attidops youngi (Peckham & Peckham, 1888) – USA, Canada

References

External links
 Pictures of A. cinctipes
 Pictures of A. nickersoni

Salticidae
Spiders of North America
Salticidae genera